In enzymology, a precorrin-3B synthase is an enzyme that catalyzes the chemical reaction

precorrin-3A + NADH + H+ + O2  precorrin-3B + NAD+ + H2O

The 4 substrates of this enzyme are precorrin 3A, NADH, H+, and O2, whereas its 3 products are precorrin 3B, NAD+, and H2O.

This enzyme belongs to the family of oxidoreductases, specifically those acting on paired donors, with O2 as oxidant and incorporation or reduction of oxygen. The oxygen incorporated need not be derived from O2 with NADH or NADPH as one donor, and incorporation of one atom o oxygen into the other donor.  The systematic name of this enzyme class is precorrin-3A,NADH:oxygen oxidoreductase (20-hydroxylating). Other names in common use include precorrin-3X synthase, and CobG.  This enzyme is part of the biosynthetic pathway to cobalamin (vitamin B12) in aerobic bacteria.

See also
 Cobalamin biosynthesis

References

 
 
 

EC 1.14.13
NADPH-dependent enzymes
NADH-dependent enzymes
Enzymes of unknown structure